Mohamed Nagy (born 20 December 1996), known by his nickname Gedo, is an Egyptian footballer who plays as a forward.

References

1996 births
Living people
People from Monufia Governorate
Egyptian footballers
Association football forwards
Egyptian Premier League players
Baladeyet El Mahalla SC players
Tersana SC players
Al Merreikh SC (Egypt) players
Al Ittihad Alexandria Club players
El Qanah FC players
Tanta SC players
21st-century Egyptian people